The words theoconservatism and  theocon are portmanteaus of "theocracy" and "conservatism"/"conservative" coined as variants of "neoconservatism" and "neocon". They have been used as labels, sometimes pejorative, referring to members of the Christian right, particularly those whose ideology represents a synthesis of elements of American conservatism, conservative Christianity, and social conservatism, expressed through political means.  The term theocon first appeared in 1996 in an article in The New Republic entitled "Neocon v. Theocon" by Jacob Heilbrunn, where he wrote:
[T]he neoconservatives believe that America is special because it was founded on an idea—a commitment to the rights of man embodied in the Declaration of Independence—not in ethnic or religious affiliations. The theocons, too, argue that America is rooted in an idea, but they believe that idea is Christianity.

Mainstream media have used the terms to identify religious conservatives. Journalist Andrew Sullivan has commonly used the concept, as have political cartoonists Cox & Forkum in reference to former Florida Secretary of State Katherine Harris.

Notable people
 Hadley Arkes
 Stephen Barr
 Mary Eberstadt
 Robert P. George
 Mary Ann Glendon
 Michael Novak
 Kate O'Beirne
 Ramesh Ponnuru
 Robert Royal
 George Weigel

See also

 Christian nationalism
 Christian Patriot movement
 Christian reconstructionism
 Dominion theology
 Neo-Calvinism
 Protestant fundamentalism
 Roman Catholic integralism
 Traditionalist conservatism

References

Further reading
Linker, Damon (2006). The Theocons: Secular America Under Siege.

Evangelicalism in the United States
Political neologisms
Religion and politics
Neoconservatism
New Right (United States)